Polydextrose is a synthetic polymer of glucose. It is a food ingredient classified as soluble fiber by the US FDA as well as Health Canada, . It is frequently used to increase the dietary fiber content of food, to replace sugar, and to reduce calories and fat content. It is a multi-purpose food ingredient synthesized from dextrose (glucose), plus about 10 percent sorbitol and 1 percent citric acid. Its E number is E1200. The FDA approved it in 1981.

It is 0.1 times as sweet as sugar.

History 
Commercial manufacture of edible polydextrose originated with a process developed by Hans H. Rennhard of Pfizer, Inc. Rennhard began investigating the potential of polysaccharides as low-calorie replacements for sugar, fat, flour, and starch. In 1965, he created polydextrose, a polymer of dextrose, produced from the naturally occurring components: glucose, sorbitol, and citric acid.

Commercial uses 
Polydextrose is commonly used as a replacement for sugar, starch, and fat in commercial beverages, cakes, candies, dessert mixes, breakfast cereals, gelatins, frozen desserts, puddings, and salad dressings. Polydextrose is frequently used as an ingredient in low-carb, sugar-free, and diabetic cooking recipes. It is also used as a humectant, stabiliser, and thickening agent.

Polydextrose is a form of soluble fiber and has shown healthful prebiotic benefits when tested in animals. It contains only 1 kcal per gram and, therefore, is able to help reduce calories.

However, polydextrose is not universally well tolerated. Doses as low as 10 g cause significantly more intestinal gas and flatulence than fermentation resistant psyllium.

References 

Food additives
Edible thickening agents
Polysaccharides
E-number additives